Bonerate may be,

Pulau Bonerate
Bonerate people
Bonerate language

See also
Taka Bonerate Islands

Language and nationality disambiguation pages